Kim Min-seok may refer to:

 Kim Min-seok (politician) (born 1964), South Korean politician
 Kim Min-suk (swimmer) (born 1979), South Korean swimmer
 Kim Min-seok (actor) (born 1990), South Korean actor
 Kim Min-seok, the birth name of Xiumin (born 1990), a member of the Chinese-South Korean boy band Exo
 Kim Min-seok (singer, born 1991), (born 1991), a member of the South Korean duo MeloMance
 Kim Min-seok (table tennis) (born 1992), South Korean table tennis player
 Kim Min-seok (figure skater) (born 1993), South Korean figure skater
 Kim Min-seok (wrestler) (born 1993), South Korean wrestler
 Kim Min-seok (speed skater) (born 1999), South Korean speed skater
 Kim Min-seok, the birth name of Laun (born 1999), a former member of the South Korean boy band ONF